Free program may refer to:

Free software
Free skating